Austin & Ally: Turn It Up is the second soundtrack of the Disney Channel Original Series, Austin & Ally, following the debut soundtrack of the same name (2012). Austin & Ally: Turn It Up features songs from the second and third seasons. They are all performed by the two main stars of the show, Ross Lynch and Laura Marano, with the exception of the final track "Unstoppable", which is performed by the fifth season winners of Radio Disney's The Next BIG Thing, Chloe and Halle Bailey. There are three known versions of the soundtrack: the regular edition, the Walmart edition and the Japanese Deluxe edition.

Track listing

Charts

Weekly charts

Year-end charts

Notes
 contains an uncredited interpolation of Jack Johnson's 2006 song of the same name
 winners of Radio Disney's NBT: Next Big Thing
 first heard in the hour-long crossover special Austin & Jessie & Ally All Star New Year

References

Walt Disney Records soundtracks
2013 soundtrack albums